Brodmann area 28 is a subdivision of the cerebral cortex defined on the basis of cytoarchitecture. It is located on the medial aspect of the temporal lobe and is part of the entorhinal cortex (Brodmann-1909).

Human
In humans, Brodmann area 28, and Brodmann area 34 together constitute approximately the entorhinal cortex (Brodmann-1909).

Guenon
Brodmann regarded the location of area 28 adjacent to the hippocampus as imprecisely represented in the illustration of the cortex of the guenon brain in Brodmann-1909. It is located on the medial aspect of the temporal lobe.

Distinctive features (Brodmann-1905)
The molecular layer (I) is unusually wide; the external granular layer (II) contains nests of, for the most part, multipolar cells: the external pyramidal layer (III) contains medium-sized pyramidal cells which merge with cells of the internal pyramidal layer (V); a clear cell free zone represents sublayer 5b of layer V; the multiform layer is wide and has a less clear two sublayer structure; the internal granular layer (IV) is totally absent.

See also

 Brodmann area
 List of regions in the human brain

External links
 For Neuroanatomy of Brodmann area 28 visit BrainInfo

28
Temporal lobe
Medial surface of cerebral hemisphere